Ralph C. Mahar Regional High School is located on South Main Street in Orange, Massachusetts, United States. The public school serves students in grades 7–12 in the four towns of New Salem, Orange and Wendell in Franklin County, and  Petersham in Worcester County. The school is ranked 256th within the state of Massachusetts.

Known for its strong rivalry with Athol High School, the Thanksgiving Day football game is a cherished tradition at Mahar.

References

Public high schools in Massachusetts
Schools in Franklin County, Massachusetts